Edwin Keith Russack  (2 April 1918 – 26 February 1999) known as Keith Russack, was a politician in the State of South Australia.

History
Russack was born at Kadina, South Australia, the youngest son of Alfred Hermann Russack (1879 – 5 November 1951) and his wife Rosa. A. H. Russack was a jeweller who had served his apprenticeship with J. M. Wendt, and Keith trained as a watchmaker and was employed at his father's business in Kadina. He enlisted with the 2nd AIF early in 1940 and saw action in South-east Asia. He maintained his involvement with the military, and in 1952 was Captain of C Company 27th Infantry Battalion (South  Australian Scottish Regiment).

By 1953 he had two jewellery and gift stores in Kadina.

He was in September 1970 elected as a Liberal candidate for a Midland district seat in the Legislative Council made vacant by the death of Colin Rowe. In 1973 he won the seat of Gouger in the House of Assembly, succeeding Steele Hall. At the 1977 elections the seat of Gouger had been abolished, and Russack was not preselected for any seat, so stood as an Independent Liberal for Goyder, which he won, and subsequently rejoined the Liberal Party and held the seat until 1982, when he retired, to be succeeded by John Meier.

Other activities
He was Mayor of the Corporate Town of Kadina (as also was Liberal Premier John Olsen) from 1968 to 1971, a charter member of Kadina Rotary Club from 1959, and director of the first Kernewek Lowender Festival. He was awarded an OAM in 1989.

Family
He married Ruth Boaden Trenwith (21 November 1920 – 27 August 2000) of Kadina in February 1943. They had three sons: Rodger, Lee and Mark.

References

 

Members of the South Australian Legislative Council
Members of the South Australian House of Assembly
1918 births
1999 deaths
Liberal and Country League politicians
20th-century Australian politicians
Mayors of places in South Australia
Recipients of the Medal of the Order of Australia